A cove is a small type of bay or coastal inlet. Coves usually have narrow, restricted entrances, are often circular or oval, and are often situated within a larger bay. Small, narrow, sheltered bays, inlets, creeks, or recesses in a coast are often considered coves.

Colloquially, the term can be used to describe a sheltered bay. Geomorphology describes coves as precipitously-walled and rounded cirque-like openings as in a valley extending into or down a mountainside, or in a hollow or nook of a cliff or steep mountainside. A cove can also refer to a corner, nook, or cranny, either in a river, road, or wall, especially where the wall meets the floor.

A notable example is Lulworth Cove on the Jurassic Coast in Dorset, England. To its west, a second cove, Stair Hole, is forming.

Formation

Coves are formed by differential erosion, which occurs when softer rocks are worn away faster than the harder rocks surrounding them. These rocks further erode to form a circular bay with a narrow entrance, called a cove.

References

Coves
Bodies of water